James Royal (born James Nairn, 14 July 1941) is a British pop singer. His most international successful record was "Call My Name" in 1967.

Life and career
James Nairn was born on 14 July 1941, in Ealing near to London. Upon leaving secondary school, he served three years in the Royal Air Force. In 1963, James formed his band with which he performed under the name Jimmy Royal and the Hawks in London pubs and bars. He recorded with this group a first title in 1964 for Decca, followed by other singles in 1965 for Parlophone, the second under his own name of James Royal and emerged as a solo artist.

He signed with CBS in 1966, and the first title released by his new company in the UK in 1967 ("Call My Name") became a hit in Europe in 1968. The title is thus ranked No. 11 in France (December 1967), and No. 4 in Belgium (March 1968). But it does not work in the UK. The magazine Record World notes in its overview of the year 1968: "The French audience showed a more discriminating taste in foreign music, even carrying songs that remained unknown in their native country to the top of the charts: David McWilliams' 'Days of Pearly Spencer,' James Royal's 'Call My Name,' Moody Blues' 'Nights In White Satin'."

After this good start, eleven singles and one album were released by CBS; in addition, other singles (sometimes in a foreign language) are released for specific markets such as Germany, Spain and Italy. He is then classified as a British blue-eyed soul singer.

In 1970, Royal was persuaded by his impresario Mervyn Conn to join the Carnaby label, which he had become the owner of; the termination of the contract with CBS is negotiated in August. Six singles and two albums are produced by this label, as well as Spanish-language singles. In 1971, the title "Carolina", written by Terry Britten, obtains a success in France, Spain, Italy, Argentina and Australia.

Royal recorded three albums between 1970 and 1973, the year marking the end of his original recordings. He also records singles in different languages for foreign markets. In addition, he took part in the 1972 Jerry Lee Lewis tour. By the end of the decade, Royal's career stalled. In 1984, he left England to Australia, his wife's native country, and finally settled in 1988 in the city of Toowoomba.

Discography

Singles
 1965: (James Royal and the Hawks) "She's About A Mover" / "Black Cloud" ( Parlophone R 5290)
 1965: "Work Song" / "I Can't Stand It" (Parlophone R 5383)
 1967: "Call My Name" / "When It Comes to My Baby" (CBS 2525)
 1967: "It's All in the Game" / "Green Games" (CBS 2739)
 1967: "I Can't Stand It" / "A Little Bit of Rain" (CBS 2959)
 1968: "Take Me Like I Am" / "Sitting In The Station" (CBS 3232)
 1968: "Hey Little Boy" / "Thru' The Love" (CBS 3450)
 1968: "A Woman Called Sorrow" / "Fire" (CBS 3624)
 1969: "Time Hangs On My Mind" / "Anna-Lee " (CBS 3797)
 1969: "House Of Jack" / "Which Way To Nowhere" (CBS 3915)
 1969: "I've Got Something Bad On My Mind" / "She's Independent" (CBS 4139)
 1969: "Sent Out Love" / "I've Lost You" (CBS 4463)
 1970: "And Soon The Darkness" / "I'm Going Home" (CBS 5032)
 1971: "Noah" / "Big Heat (on the Loose)" (Carnaby [UK] / Global 6004 978 [Germany])
 1971: "Ol' Man River" / "Conspiracy Of Cards" (Carnaby [UK], Global 6004 997 [Germany])
 1971: "This Is My Woman" / "Noah" (Carnaby)
 1971: "Noah" / "The Children Outside" (Carnaby)
 1971: "Carolina" / "Woman Called Sorrow" (Carnaby 6151 002)
 1972: (Jimmy Royal & Liz Christian) "Two of Us" / "Who Are We" (Carnaby 6151 006)
 1973: "Lazy Mazie" / "Shining Sun" (Global 22523)

Albums
 1964: (Jimmy Royal and the Hawks, various artists) Ready, Steady - Win! (Decca LK 4634)
 1969: Call My Name (CBS S63780)
 1970: One Way (Carnaby CNLS 6008)
 1971: The Light And Shade Of James Royal (Carnaby 6302011) 
 1973: (Jimmy Royal) Stone Cold Soul (Nashville International NAL 5006; also (as James Royal) Global Records 26008 [Germany])
 2017:  Call My Name: Selected Recordings 1964-1970 (RPM Records Retro-989), retrospective compilation.

References

External links

1941 births
20th-century English male singers
English rhythm and blues singers
Columbia Records artists
Living people
English expatriates in Australia
20th-century Royal Air Force personnel